Daniel Wheeler (1771–1840) was a Quaker.

Biography 
Daniel Wheeler, British Quaker, minister, teacher and missionary in Russia and the South Pacific.

 1771 Born 27 November 1771 to William and Sarah Wheeler in London, England
 1777 His father William Wheeler dies.
 1783 Midshipman, Royal Navy. Mother Sarah Wheeler passes away.
 1781 - 1796 Served in army
 1790 Joined Quakers
 1796 Settled in Handsworth Woodhouse near Sheffield, began in seed trade
 1798 Received as a member of the Quakers
 1809 Moved to a country farm with sister's family
 1816 Accepted as Quaker minister
 1817 Met with Russian Czar Alexander I and became manager of imperial farms at Ohkta near St. Petersburg, Russia
 1818 22 June 1818 moved 20 members of his family and others to his farm at Shoosharry, Russia (Shushari)
 1818 - 1828, Ohkta and Shoosharry farms,  of swamp drained and became model farms.
 1828 - 1831 Visited England: made missionary voyage in Polynesia and Australasia
 1831 Returned to Shoosharry (Shushari, Russia) where 500 employees worked under supervision of his son William.
 1833 - departs London for 'voyage of concern' to Australia and the Pacific
 1835 - visits Society Islands
 1836 - visits Hawaiian Islands
 1838 - returns to London from Pacific voyage
 1839 -  Missionary tour in North America
 1839 - Book edition of journal and letters from the Pacific published in London
 1840 Died 12 June 1840 in New York after illness during the sea voyage to America. Buried in Friend's cemetery on Orchard St. New York
 1835 - 1839 Letters Journals published
 1842 Memoirs published by his son
 2014 - Daniel Wheeler's name is given to an alley in Shushary, a suburb in the South of St. Petersburg, Russia (Вилеровский переулок; 59.811636, 30.360407).

See also
 
:Category:Quakers by century

References

Extracts from the Letters and Journal of Daniel Wheeler: While Engaged in a Religious Visit to the Inhabitants of Some of the Islands of the Pacific Ocean, Van Diemen's Land, New South Wales, and New Zealand, Accompanied by His Son, Charles Wheeler, published 1840
Memoirs of the Life and Gospel Labors of the Late Daniel Wheeler, Harvey & Dutton, 1 January 1842, ASIN: B002BQL15, Yoriginally published 1842.
Quaker Pioneers in Russia, Cornell University Library, 1 June 2009,  Originally published 1902.
Memoirs of the life and gospel labours of Daniel Wheeler, a minister of the society of Friends by Daniel Wheeler (Originally published  1843)

External links
 
Adherents.com's Famous Quakers Page
Jenny's Famous Quakers Page

English Quakers
Converts to Quakerism
1771 births
1840 deaths
Quaker missionaries
Protestant missionaries in Russia
Protestant missionaries in French Polynesia
Protestant missionaries in Hawaii
Protestant missionaries in Australia
Protestant missionaries in New Zealand
English Protestant missionaries